Szembek is a Polish coat of arms used by the Szembek szlachta family in the times of the Polish–Lithuanian Commonwealth. This family originated from Tyrol, their name Schönbeck was polonized around 1566.

History

Blazon

Notable bearers
Notable bearers of this coat of arms include:
 Jan Szembek

See also
 Polish heraldry
 Heraldry
 Coat of arms

Polish coats of arms